James G Higginson (January 1885 - September 1940) was an English first-class cricketer who played one first-class game for Worcestershire against Somerset at Amblecote in 1912. Batting at number eleven, he scored no runs in his only innings (but maintained an infinite batting average on account of remaining not out), and took no wickets or catches.

Baker was born in Worcester, and died in Wolverhampton aged 55.

External links
 

1885 births
1940 deaths
Sportspeople from Worcester, England
English cricketers
Worcestershire cricketers